Terrence Johnson (born July 5, 1986) is an American football cornerback who is currently a free agent. He played college football at California (PA). Johnson graduated from Woodland Hills High School outside of Pittsburgh, Pennsylvania.  He is one of the many players to reach the NFL from coach George Novak's football program at Woodland Hills.

Professional career

New England Patriots
After going undrafted in the 2010 NFL Draft, Johnson signed with the New England Patriots as an undrafted free agent on April 29, 2010. He was waived on August 23, 2010. He was re-signed on August 29 and cut two days later.

Indianapolis Colts
Johnson was signed to the Indianapolis Colts' practice squad on December 23, 2010. He was signed to a future contract on January 10, 2011.

Atlanta Falcons
On September 11, 2012, the Atlanta Falcons signed Johnson to a contract. He was released on August 30, 2013.

Los Angeles KISS
On July 1, 2014, Johnson was assigned to the Los Angeles KISS of the Arena Football League (AFL).

References

External links
 California Vulcans bio
 Indianapolis Colts bio
 ESPN.com bio

1986 births
Living people
Sportspeople from Pennsylvania
Players of American football from Pennsylvania
American football cornerbacks
California Vulcans football players
Indianapolis Colts players
Atlanta Falcons players
Los Angeles Kiss players